Moyne L. Kelly (29 October 1901 – 11 April 1988) was an American politician from Texas.

Kelly won a special election in January 1955, and succeeded David Ratliff as a Democratic member of the Texas House of Representatives from District 85. Kelly retained his seat as a state representative during the November 1956 state legislative elections, and served until January 1959. During his tenure as a state legislator, Kelly lived in Afton.

References

1901 births
1988 deaths
20th-century American politicians
Democratic Party members of the Texas House of Representatives
People from Dickens County, Texas